DreamUp PBC is a Public-benefit corporation that offers space-based educational activities for learners of all ages. DreamUp is a spin-off and sister company of Nanoracks LLC, a private company that develops products and offers services for the commercial utilization of space. DreamUp aims to provide in-space opportunities to non-professionals who've never had access to space before - students, teachers and learners worldwide.

Under Nanoracks' umbrella, DreamUp customers launched over 500 educational projects conducted on the NASA International Space Station. The customer base spans more than 44 U.S. states and 16 countries.

Via its launch partner Nanoracks, DreamUp has access to research opportunities on the U.S. National Lab on board the International Space Station.

DreamUp is part of XO Markets, a holding company for commercial space exploration, of which a majority stake is held by Voyager Space Holdings.

Platforms

International Space Station
DreamUp provides access to facilities on the International Space Station (ISS) that include:
Nanoracks Mixstix - 2U NanoLab research modules are dedicated to provide housing for up to twenty four individual (Mixstix) allowing all microgravity reactions and materials to be captured for analysis on the International Space Station or returned to Earth via the Cargo Dragon.
Nanoracks Microscopes Facility – one optical microscope and one reflective microscope currently housed in research rack assemblies on the ISS which provide a USB-connection to astronaut laptop computers for analysis and downlink of image and video data to terrestrial laboratories.
Nanoracks Centrifuge – can simulate gravity on the Moon or Mars as well as provide standard laboratory centrifuge capabilities
Nanoracks Nanolab Platforms – include both standard space-capable lab racks to provide power and data transfer capabilities as well as CubeLabs Modules experimental platforms.  Several standard rack sizes are available to accommodate nanoscale research in microgravity experiments that require various amounts of rack volume.

Launches
DreamUp provides its customers with the opportunity to participate in the myLAUNCH experience, a launch viewing event organized in collaboration with NASA and Nanoracks for missions to the International Space Station via SpaceX, Northrop Grumman, and other launch providers.

DreamUp myLAUNCH events to date:
Orbital ATK's Cygnus CRS OA-6: DreamUp customers attended the OA-6 launch where DreamUp and Nanoracks flew five payloads through California-based Valley Christian Schools, an experiment from Carmel Christian High School in Matthews, North Carolina, an experiment from the Surya Institute in Indonesia, and an experiment from the SMA Unggul Del School in Indonesia.

See also
NASA
Private spaceflight
Center for the Advancement of Science in Space
Blue Origin
Space Angels Network
SpaceX
Dragon spacecraft
Orbital ATK
Orbital Sciences Cygnus

References

External links
 
 XO Markets
 Company website
 NASA - NanoRacks Platforms

Aerospace companies
Aerospace companies of the United States
Private spaceflight companies